The ValleyStar Credit Union 300 is a late model race held at Martinsville Speedway in the early fall each year since 1985.

History
In 1970, Martinsville Speedway added 250-lap twin features for the Late Model Sportsman and Modified classes annually.  At the time, neither division used a touring format.  The doubleheader took a drastic change from 1982 until 1985 when NASCAR began turning lower divisions of racing into a touring format to reduce costs by racing one single tour.  The Late Model Sportsman race was changed to what is now the NASCAR Xfinity Series in 1982, and the Modified race was adopted into the NASCAR Whelen Modified Tour in 1985.  As the touring formats were adopted fully for the 1985 season, Martinsville Speedway cut the two races from 250 laps to 200 laps in 1985, and returned the local Late Models to the schedule in 1985, adding a 100-lap Late Model feature to the race weekend.  After the Modifieds were dropped in 1993, the race expanded to its present 200-lap feature race.  After what is now the Xfinity Series was dropped after the 1994 season, the current Late Model format was adopted in 1995.  The spring race was dropped after the 1997 season.

The race is 300 laps in total length, consisting of three 25 lap heat races, a 25 lap last chance qualifier and a 200 lap feature race. Qualifying takes place the Friday before the race and sets the field for the heat races. The top two drivers in qualifying advance to the feature, and do not race in the heat races.  The top ten finishers in each of three heat races advance to the feature, while other drivers race in the last chance race.  The top ten finishers in the last chance race advance to the feature.  The race format was changed in 2012 and tweaked in 2013 and again in 2014.  The original race format called for traditional time trial qualifying on Saturday to set the top 22 positions while the remaining 20 positions were determined by four heat races.

The finishes to the 2013 and 2014 editions were marred by officiating decisions regarding the leader's ability to choose when to restart the field.

After numerous incidents in recent years with darkness, the track added lights for the 2017 race, being held in late September, which prior to 2000 was the NASCAR Cup date, which now is on the traditional final weekend of October that the Late Model race was held for many years. The prize for the race winner is $25,000 and the track's traditional grandfather clock trophy. For the 2019 edition, cars will be allowed to use duplicate numbers after not being able to do so in the past as the track's scoreboard and timing and scoring system allows them to have alphanumeric numbers (12P, 5P, for example, car numbers carry the first letter of the driver's surname).  Also, the qualifying format changed to setting the Top 20 cars on Friday and then two 50-lap heat races.  The top ten drivers in each heat advance.  The feature race will have safety car periods at Lap 75 and 150, but if a Safety Car is called for an incident beforehand, that becomes the pre-planned safety car break.  Also there is no limit to the number of attempts to finish a race under a green flag.

In 2019, Josh Berry claimed his first 300 win, leading all 200 laps in his JR Motorsports entry. COVID-19, however, forced the cancellation of the event, with race tracks in Virginia still under quarantine restrictions. With restrictions eased in 2021, the race returned, with 16-year old Landon Pembelton surprising the field to claim the checkered flag.

Cars and drivers
Drivers must hold a NASCAR License for the Whelen All-American Series. Cars must conform to the NASCAR Late Model Stock Car rule book and race on 10 inch wide Hoosier racing slicks.

These cars use a Perimeter Chassis, where the frame rails follow the outer perimeter of the body, being symmetrical from the centerline of the frame.  This chassis is generally used in limited late model and spec late model competition. Late Model Stock Cars (LMSC) are distinctly different from Super Late Models (SLM), where the passenger side is considerably higher than the driver side (also called an Offset Chassis) using what is called an "Approved Body Configuration" body, such as the Snowball Derby, Winchester 400, and other similar races. LMSC are raced mostly in the South East region of the United States, including Virginia, Tennessee, and the Carolinas, and the CARS Late Model Stock Tour being events that use this type of car.

Winners

References

External links
 Virginia Tourism Corporation race sponsorship announcement

 
1970 establishments in Virginia
Sporting events in the United States
Recurring sporting events established in 1970